James Sinclair is an American classical conductor.

Sinclair studied at Indiana University, taught at the University of Hawaii, then moved to New Haven, Connecticut in 1972, where he joined Yale University. Sinclair has been the Music Director of Orchestra New England from 1974 to the present. He was also music director of the Yale Symphony Orchestra from 1994 to 1995.

Sinclair is notably a specialist in the music of Charles Ives; he has "spent [his] whole adult life devoted to the music of Charles Ives."  He has published A Descriptive Catalogue of the Music of Charles Ives with the Yale University Press and served as music director for a number of PBS documentaries, including A Good Dissonance Like a Man, about Ives. He is currently an Associate Fellow of Berkeley College and overseas the Charles Ives papers, as well as those of pianist and Ives scholar John Kirkpatrick.

As a conductor, Sinclair has recorded a number of Ives works, as part of a complete set of Ives' orchestral music projected to be in nine discs for the Naxos label. He is one of the interviewed Ives scholars in the 2018 documentary The Unanswered Ives.

References

External links
 James Sinclair's biography on the Naxos web site
 James Sinclair discusses the music of Charles Ives

American male conductors (music)
Living people
Place of birth missing (living people)
Year of birth missing (living people)
21st-century American conductors (music)
21st-century American male musicians